Beautiful Noise is the tenth album by Neil Diamond and his third with Columbia Records, released in 1976. "Dry Your Eyes" was performed with The Band at their farewell show and is featured in Martin Scorsese's The Last Waltz.

Overview
Beautiful Noise marked a radical departure in production, style, arrangements and compositional diversity for Diamond. It was billed at the time of its release as something of a "comeback" album for the artist, and did mark a new and highly productive phase of his recording and touring career.

The album produced three singles: "If You Know What I Mean", "Don't Think... Feel", and the title track, "Beautiful Noise". "If You Know What I Mean" was a No. 1 hit on Billboard's Easy Listening chart and reached No. 11 on the US Hit Parade. "Don't Think... Feel" reached No. 43 in the U.S. charts, while "Beautiful Noise" reached No. 13 on the UK Singles Chart, No. 7 in South Africa and No. 6 in the then West Germany.  It also made it to No. 6 in Switzerland, No. 8 in Austria, No. 3 in the Netherlands and No. 6 in Flemish Belgium.

Cash Box said of the title song "orchestration begins the tune as Diamond steps in with his well-known vocal style includes a revolving crousel organ."  Record World said that "an accordian lends a distinct, atmospheric sound" to the track.

The album was produced by Robbie Robertson, known for his work with The Band. Garth Hudson of The Band also contributed organ to several songs.

Track listing
All tracks composed by Neil Diamond, except "Dry Your Eyes" by Diamond and Robbie Robertson.

Personnel
Neil Diamond – vocals, acoustic guitar, rhythm guitar, dobro
Richard Bennett, Robbie Robertson, Jesse Ed Davis – guitar
Bob Boucher - bass guitar, ARP
Larry Knechtel – piano, Fender Rhodes
Alan Lindgren - piano, synthesizer
Dennis St. John – drums, percussion
David Paich – Fender Rhodes, piano
Garth Hudson – Hammond organ, Lowrey organ
Jim Keltner, Russ Kunkel – drums
Jim Gordon – drums, congas, harmony vocals
James Newton Howard – ARP, synthesizer
Joe Lala – percussion, tambourine, congas
Dr. John – Hammond organ
Bob James – piano, arrangement, Fender Rhodes
Tommy Morgan – harmonica
Bob Findley – trumpet
Jerome Richardson – flute, clarinet
Linda Press – backing vocals
Nick DeCaro – arrangements, accordion

Charts

Weekly charts

Year-end charts

Certifications

References

1976 albums
Albums produced by Robbie Robertson
Columbia Records albums
Neil Diamond albums
Albums recorded at Shangri-La (recording studio)
Albums with cover art by Reid Miles